The 2023 Chicago Cubs season will be the 152nd season of the Chicago Cubs franchise, the 148th in the National League, and the Cubs' 108th season at Wrigley Field. The Cubs will be managed by David Ross, in his fourth year as Cubs manager, as members of Major League Baseball's National League Central division. The Cubs will begin the season March 30 at the Milwaukee Brewers and will also finish the season against the Brewers on October 1. 

Pursuant to the collective bargaining agreement entered into by the owners in players ending 2022 lockout, the Cubs will play every team in baseball at least one series and intra-division games will be reduced from 18 or 19 games to 13 games against each division opponent.

Previous season 
The Cubs finished the 2022 season 74–88, 19 games out of first place. They missed the playoffs for the second consecutive season.

Offseason

Coaching changes 
On October 28, 2022, the team announced that hitting coach Greg Brown would not return. Cubs' minor league hitting coordinator, Dustin Kelly, was named the new hitting coach.

Rule changes 
Pursuant to the CBA, new rule changes will be in place for the 2023 season:

 institution of a pitch clock between pitches;
 limits on pickoff attempts per plate appearance;
 limits on defensive shifts requiring two infielders to be on either side of second and be within the boundary of the infield; and
 larger bases (increased to 18-inch squares).

Transactions

October 2022

Source

November 2022

Source

December 2022

Source

January 2023

Source

February 2023

Source

March 2023

Source

Regular season

Opening Day starters 
Thursday, March 30, 2023 vs. Milwaukee Brewers at Wrigley Field

Game Log  

|-style=background: 
| 1 || March 30 || Brewers || || || || || || ||
|-style=background: 
| 2 || April 1 || Brewers || || || || || || ||
|-style=background: 
| 3 || April 2 || Brewers || || || || || || ||
|-style=background: 
| 4 || April 3 || @ Reds || || || || || || ||
|-style=background: 
| 5 || April 4 || @ Reds || || || || || || ||
|-style=background: 
| 6 || April 5 || @ Reds || || || || || || ||
|-style=background: 
| 7 || April 7 || Rangers || || || || || || ||
|-style=background: 
| 8 || April 8 || Rangers || || || || || || ||
|-style=background: 
| 9 || April 9 || Rangers || || || || || || ||
|-style=background: 
| 10 || April 10 || Mariners || || || || || || ||
|-style=background: 
| 11 || April 11 || Mariners || || || || || || ||
|-style=background: 
| 12 || April 12 || Mariners || || || || || || ||
|-style=background: 
| 13 || April 14 || @ Dodgers || || || || || || ||
|-style=background: 
| 14 || April 15 || @ Dodgers || || || || || || ||
|-style=background: 
| 15 || April 16 || @ Dodgers || || || || || || ||
|-style=background: 
| 16 || April 17 || @ Athletics || || || || || || ||
|-style=background: 
| 17 || April 18 || @ Athletics || || || || || || ||
|-style=background: 
| 18 || April 19 || @ Athletics || || || || || || ||
|-style=background: 
| 19 || April 20 || Dodgers || || || || || || ||
|-style=background: 
| 20 || April 21 || Dodgers || || || || || || ||
|-style=background: 
| 21 || April 22 || Dodgers || || || || || || ||
|-style=background: 
| 22 || April 23 || Dodgers || || || || || || ||
|-style=background: 
| 23 || April 25 || Padres || || || || || || ||
|-style=background: 
| 24 || April 26 || Padres || || || || || || ||
|-style=background: 
| 25 || April 27 || Padres || || || || || || ||
|-style=background: 
| 26 || April 28 || @ Marlins || || || || || || ||
|-style=background: 
| 27 || April 29 || @ Marlins || || || || || || ||
|-style=background: 
| 28 || April 30 || @ Marlins || || || || || || ||
|- 
 

|-style=background: 
| 29 || May 1 || @ Nationals || || || || || || ||
|-style=background: 
| 30 || May 2 || @ Nationals || || || || || || ||
|-style=background: 
| 31 || May 3 || @ Nationals || || || || || || ||
|-style=background: 
| 32 || May 4 || @ Nationals || || || || || || ||
|-style=background: 
| 33 || May 5 || Marlins || || || || || || ||
|-style=background: 
| 34 || May 6 || Marlins || || || || || || ||
|-style=background: 
| 35 || May 7 || Marlins || || || || || || ||
|-style=background: 
| 36 || May 8 || Cardinals || || || || || || ||
|-style=background: 
| 37 || May 9 || Cardinals || || || || || || ||
|-style=background: 
| 38 || May 10 || Cardinals || || || || || || ||
|-style=background: 
| 39 || May 12 || @ Twins || || || || || || ||
|-style=background: 
| 40 || May 13 || @ Twins || || || || || || ||
|-style=background: 
| 41 || May 14 || @ Twins || || || || || || ||
|-style=background: 
| 42 || May 15 || @ Astros || || || || || || ||
|-style=background: 
| 43 || May 16 || @ Astros || || || || || || ||
|-style=background: 
| 44 || May 17 || @ Astros || || || || || || ||
|-style=background: 
| 45 || May 19 || @ Phillies || || || || || || ||
|-style=background: 
| 46 || May 20 || @ Phillies || || || || || || ||
|-style=background: 
| 47 || May 21 || @ Phillies || || || || || || ||
|-style=background: 
| 48 || May 23 || Mets || || || || || || ||
|-style=background: 
| 49 || May 24 || Mets || || || || || || ||
|-style=background: 
| 50 || May 25 || Mets || || || || || || ||
|-style=background: 
| 51 || May 26 || Reds || || || || || || ||
|-style=background: 
| 52 || May 27 || Reds || || || || || || ||
|-style=background: 
| 53 || May 28 || Reds || || || || || || ||
|-style=background: 
| 54 || May 29 || Rays || || || || || || ||
|-style=background: 
| 55 || May 30 || Rays || || || || || || ||
|-style=background: 
| 56 || May 31 || Rays || || || || || || ||
|- 
 

|-style=background: 
| 57 || June 2 || @ Padres || || || || || || ||
|-style=background: 
| 58 || June 3 || @ Padres || || || || || || ||
|-style=background: 
| 59 || June 4 || @ Padres || || || || || || ||
|-style=background: 
| 60 || June 5 || @ Padres || || || || || || ||
|-style=background: 
| 61 || June 6 || @ Angels || || || || || || ||
|-style=background: 
| 62 || June 7 || @ Angels || || || || || || ||
|-style=background: 
| 63 || June 8 || @ Angels || || || || || || ||
|-style=background: 
| 64 || June 9 || @ Giants || || || || || || ||
|-style=background: 
| 65 || June 10 || @ Giants || || || || || || ||
|-style=background: 
| 66 || June 11 || @ Giants || || || || || || ||
|-style=background: 
| 67 || June 13 || Pirates || || || || || || ||
|-style=background: 
| 68 || June 14 || Pirates || || || || || || ||
|-style=background: 
| 69 || June 15 || Pirates || || || || || || ||
|-style=background: 
| 70 || June 16 || Orioles || || || || || || ||
|-style=background: 
| 71 || June 17 || Orioles || || || || || || ||
|-style=background: 
| 72 || June 18 || Orioles || || || || || || ||
|-style=background: 
| 73 || June 19 || @ Pirates || || || || || || ||
|-style=background: 
| 74 || June 20 || @ Pirates || || || || || || ||
|-style=background: 
| 75 || June 21 || @ Pirates || || || || || || ||
|-style=background: 
| 76 || June 24 || @ Cardinals || || || || || || ||
|-style=background: 
| 77 || June 25 || @ Cardinals || || || || || || ||
|-style=background: 
| 78 || June 27 || Phillies || || || || || || ||
|-style=background: 
| 79 || June 28 || Phillies || || || || || || ||
|-style=background: 
| 80 || June 29 || Phillies || || || || || || ||
|-style=background: 
| 81 || June 30 || Guardians || || || || || || ||
|-
|colspan=11|
|- 
 

|-style=background: 
| 82 || July 1 || Guardians || || || || || || ||
|-style=background: 
| 83 || July 2 || Guardians || || || || || || ||
|-style=background: 
| 84 || July 3 || @ Brewers || || || || || || ||
|-style=background: 
| 85 || July 4 || @ Brewers || || || || || || ||
|-style=background: 
| 86 || July 5 || @ Brewers || || || || || || ||
|-style=background: 
| 87 || July 6 || @ Brewers || || || || || || ||
|-style=background: 
| 88 || July 7 || @ Yankees || || || || || || ||
|-style=background: 
| 89 || July 8 || @ Yankees || || || || || || ||
|-style=background: 
| 90 || July 9 || @ Yankees || || || || || || ||
|-style="text-align:center; background:#bff;
| ASG || July 11 || NL @ AL || || || || || || ||
|-style=background: 
| 91 || July 14 || Red Sox || || || || || || ||
|-style=background: 
| 92 || July 15 || Red Sox || || || || || || ||
|-style=background: 
| 93 || July 16 || Red Sox || || || || || || ||
|-style=background: 
| 94 || July 17 || Nationals || || || || || || ||
|-style=background: 
| 95 || July 18 || Nationals || || || || || || ||
|-style=background: 
| 96 || July 19 || Nationals || || || || || || ||
|-style=background: 
| 97 || July 20 || Cardinals || || || || || || ||
|-style=background: 
| 98 || July 21 || Cardinals || || || || || || ||
|-style=background: 
| 99 || July 22 || Cardinals || || || || || || ||
|-style=background: 
| 100 || July 23 || Cardinals || || || || || || ||
|-style=background: 
| 101 || July 25 || @ White Sox || || || || || || ||
|-style=background: 
| 102 || July 26 || @ White Sox || || || || || || ||
|-style=background: 
| 103 || July 27 || @ Cardinals || || || || || || ||
|-style=background: 
| 104 || July 28 || @ Cardinals || || || || || || ||
|-style=background: 
| 105 || July 29 || @ Cardinals || || || || || || ||
|-style=background: 
| 106 || July 30 || @ Cardinals || || || || || || ||
|-style=background: 
| 107 || July 31 || Reds || || || || || || ||
|- 
 

|-style=background: 
| 108 || August 1 || Reds || || || || || || ||
|-style=background: 
| 109 || August 2 || Reds || || || || || || ||
|-style=background: 
| 110 || August 3 || Reds || || || || || || ||
|-style=background: 
| 111 || August 4 || Braves || || || || || || ||
|-style=background: 
| 112 || August 5 || Braves || || || || || || ||
|-style=background: 
| 113 || August 6 || Braves || || || || || || ||
|-style=background: 
| 114 || August 7 || @ Mets || || || || || || ||
|-style=background: 
| 115 || August 8 || @ Mets || || || || || || ||
|-style=background: 
| 116 || August 9 || @ Mets || || || || || || ||
|-style=background: 
| 117 || August 11 || @ Blue Jays || || || || || || ||
|-style=background: 
| 118 || August 12 || @ Blue Jays || || || || || || ||
|-style=background: 
| 119 || August 13 || @ Blue Jays || || || || || || ||
|-style=background: 
| 120 || August 15 || White Sox || || || || || || ||
|-style=background: 
| 121 || August 16 || White Sox || || || || || || ||
|-style=background: 
| 122 || August 18 || Royals || || || || || || ||
|-style=background: 
| 123 || August 19 || Royals || || || || || || ||
|-style=background: 
| 124 || August 20 || Royals || || || || || || ||
|-style=background: 
| 125 || August 21 || @ Tigers || || || || || || ||
|-style=background: 
| 126 || August 22 || @ Tigers || || || || || || ||
|-style=background: 
| 127 || August 23 || @ Tigers || || || || || || ||
|-style=background: 
| 128 || August 24 || @ Pirates || || || || || || ||
|-style=background: 
| 129 || August 25 || @ Pirates || || || || || || ||
|-style=background: 
| 130 || August 26 || @ Pirates || || || || || || ||
|-style=background: 
| 131 || August 27 || @ Pirates || || || || || || ||
|-style=background: 
| 132 || August 28 || Brewers || || || || || || ||
|-style=background: 
| 133 || August 29 || Brewers || || || || || || ||
|-style=background: 
| 134 || August 30 || Brewers || || || || || || ||
|- 
 

|-style=background: 
| 135 || September 1 || @ Reds || || || || || || ||
|-style=background: 
| 136 || September 2 || @ Reds || || || || || || ||
|-style=background: 
| 137 || September 3 || @ Reds || || || || || || ||
|-style=background: 
| 138 || September 4 || Giants || || || || || || ||
|-style=background: 
| 139 || September 5 || Giants || || || || || || ||
|-style=background: 
| 140 || September 6 || Giants || || || || || || ||
|-style=background: 
| 141 || September 7 || Diamondbacks || || || || || || ||
|-style=background: 
| 142 || September 8 || Diamondbacks || || || || || || ||
|-style=background: 
| 143 || September 9 || Diamondbacks || || || || || || ||
|-style=background: 
| 144 || September 10 || Diamondbacks || || || || || || ||
|-style=background: 
| 145 || September 11 || @ Rockies || || || || || || ||
|-style=background: 
| 146 || September 12 || @ Rockies || || || || || || ||
|-style=background: 
| 147 || September 13 || @ Rockies || || || || || || ||
|-style=background: 
| 148 || September 15 || @ Diamondbacks || || || || || || ||
|-style=background: 
| 149 || September 16 || @ Diamondbacks || || || || || || ||
|-style=background: 
| 150 || September 17 || @ Diamondbacks || || || || || || ||
|-style=background: 
| 151 || September 19 || Pirates || || || || || || ||
|-style=background: 
| 152 || September 20 || Pirates || || || || || || ||
|-style=background: 
| 153 || September 21 || Pirates || || || || || || ||
|-style=background: 
| 154 || September 22 || Rockies || || || || || || ||
|-style=background: 
| 155 || September 23 || Rockies || || || || || || ||
|-style=background: 
| 156 || September 24 || Rockies || || || || || || ||
|-style=background: 
| 157 || September 26 || @ Braves || || || || || || ||
|-style=background: 
| 158 || September 27 || @ Braves || || || || || || ||
|-style=background: 
| 159 || September 28 || @ Braves || || || || || || ||
|-style=background: 
| 160 || September 29 || @ Brewers || || || || || || ||
|-style=background: 
| 161 || September 30 || @ Brewers || || || || || || ||
|-style=background: 
| 162 || October 1 || @ Brewers || || || || || || ||
|-

Season standings

National League Central

National League Wild Card

Roster

Farm system 
On February 10, the Cubs announced the minor league managers for their farm system.

References

External links 
Chicago Cubs 2023 Schedule at MLB.com
2023 Chicago Cubs at ESPN
2023 Chicago Cubs season at Baseball Reference

Chicago Cubs
Cubs
Cubs
Chicago Cubs seasons